Xinhua District is a district of the city of Cangzhou, Hebei, China.

Administrative divisions

Subdistricts:
North Jianshe Avenue Subdistrict, Chezhan Subdistrict, Nanda Avenue Subdistrict, Donghuan Subdistrict, Daodong Subdistrict

The only township is Xiaozhaozhuang Township

External links

County-level divisions of Hebei
Cangzhou